Wormerveer is a railway station in Wormerveer, Netherlands. The station was opened on the Den Helder–Amsterdam railway on 1 November 1869. The station is on the southern edge of the town, approx. 200m south of the river Zaan. Behind the station are many fields of marshes and reeds, As well as a local Football club and Paintball area. The train services are operated by Nederlandse Spoorwegen.

Train services
The following train services call at Wormerveer:
2x per hour local service (sprinter) Uitgeest - Zaandam - Amsterdam - Woerden - Rotterdam (all day, every day)
2x per hour local service (sprinter) Uitgeest - Zaandam - Amsterdam - Utrecht - Rhenen (only on weekdays until 8:00PM)

Bus services

The following bus services call at/start from Wormerveer

References

External links
NS website 
Dutch Public Transport journey planner 
NS Station website 

Railway stations in North Holland
Railway stations opened in 1869
Railway stations on the Staatslijn K
1869 establishments in the Netherlands
Railway stations in the Netherlands opened in the 19th century